Mircea Rednic (born 9 April 1962) is a Romanian football coach and former player who played as a defender.

Club career

Mircea Rednic, nicknamed "Puriul" was born on 9 April 1962 in Hunedoara and until he was 14 years old he played table tennis, handball, volleyball and chess before starting to play football at Corvinul Hunedoara's youth center. Coach Mircea Lucescu gave him his debut for Corvinul's senior squad in the 1979–80 Divizia B season, also giving him his Divizia A debut on 2 August 1980 in a 4–1 victory against ASA Târgu Mureș. In the following seasons Rednic helped the club finish 3rd in the 1981–82 Divizia A, also appearing in four games in the 1982–83 UEFA Cup. In the summer of 1983 Rednic and teammate Ioan Andone were transferred from Corvinul to Dinamo București in exchange for five players which included Nicușor Vlad, Teofil Stredie and Florea Văetuș. Rednic spent a total of 7 seasons with The Red Dogs, winning the title in his first season in which he played 31 games and in the 1989–90 season with 19 appearances and one goal scored. During the same period, Rednic also won three Cupa României and played 36 games in which he scored two goals in European competitions, appearing in 8 games in which he scored one goal in the 1983–84 European Cup season when the team reached the semi-finals and in 8 games in which he scored one goal in the 1989–90 UEFA Cup Winners' Cup campaign when the team also reached the semi-finals with his former Corvinul coach, Mircea Lucescu. Rednic took part in a big scandal in the derby against Steaua from March 1989 which was lost with 2–1 after Gheorghe Hagi opened the score, Ioan Andone equalized for Dinamo and Gabi Balint scored the winning goal for Steaua in the last minute of the game, also referee Ion Crăciunescu eliminated Rodion Cămătaru and Claudiu Vaișcovici from Dinamo. Feeling that they were disadvantaged by the referee, right after the game Rednic and Andone showed some obscene gestures in front of the official tribune where Valentin Ceaușescu, the son of dictator Nicolae Ceaușescu and unofficial president of Steaua was staying. Rednic got away with it after a friend of his from Steaua, László Bölöni talked to Valentin Ceaușescu, and Andone was initially suspended for a year by the Romanian Football Federation, but after his friend from Steaua, Marius Lăcătuș talked to Valentin Ceaușescu and convinced him to forgive Andone, his suspension was reduced to three months. After the 1989 Romanian Revolution, Rednic alongside fellow Romanians Claudiu Vaișcovici and Gheorghe Nițu went to play in Turkey for Bursaspor. In 1991, coach Mircea Lucescu told him to go to Standard Liège because that is the team that he will be coaching in the near future, however Lucescu never got to train there but Rednic spent five seasons with the club in which he made 140 Belgian First Division appearances with three goals scored, played three games in European competitions, won a Belgian Cup and was colleague for short periods with fellow Romanians Bogdan Stelea and Gheorghe Butoiu. After his period at Standard Liège ended, he moved at fellow Belgian First Division club Sint-Truidense, where he stayed only one season in which he played 10 games. In 1997, Rednic returned to Romania at Rapid București, at the advice of coach Mircea Lucescu, where he would spend the last three years of his playing career, appearing in 32 matches in which he scored one goal in the 1998–99 season, helping the team win the first title after 32 years, he also won a cup, a supercup and played four games in European competitions. Mircea Rednic gained throughout his career a total of 391 Divizia A appearances with 29 goals scored and a total of 47 matches with 2 goals scored in European competitions.

International career
Mircea Rednic played 83 matches and scored two goals at international level for Romania, making his debut under coach Mircea Lucescu in a 0–0 against Switzerland at the 1982 World Cup qualifiers. He made 8 appearances at the successful Euro 1984 qualifiers, being used by coach Mircea Lucescu in all the minutes of the three matches from the final tournament as Romania did not pass the group stage. He played 8 games at the 1986 World Cup qualifiers, four at the Euro 1988 qualifiers and three at the successful 1990 World Cup qualifiers, being used by coach Emerich Jenei in all the minutes of the four matches from the final tournament, as Romania got eliminated by Ireland in the eight-finals. Rednic played one game at the Euro 1992 qualifiers and made his last appearance for the national team on 23 May 1991 in a friendly which ended with a 1–0 loss against Norway. Rednic was also part of Romania's U20 squad at the 1981 World Youth Championship from Australia, appearing in 6 games, helping the team finish the tournament in the 3rd position, winning the bronze medal.

For representing his country at the 1990 World Cup, Rednic was decorated by President of Romania Traian Băsescu on 25 March 2008 with the Ordinul "Meritul Sportiv" – (The Medal "The Sportive Merit") class III.

International goals
Scores and results list Romania's goal tally first, score column indicates score after each Rednic goal.

Managerial career
Mircea Rednic had his first coaching experience while still being an active player in December 1998 at Rapid București when Mircea Lucescu left the club to go train Inter Milan and he was appointed as a caretaker manager for one Divizia A game, a 3–0 victory against Universitatea Cluj. He started working as a full-time coach in 2000 when he was appointed at Rapid București in order to replace Anghel Iordănescu. He then moved to fellow Divizia A team FCM Bacău where he stayed only a few months, returning in 2002 at Rapid. His second spell at Rapid was one in which he won the first trophies of his coaching career, consisting of the Divizia A 2002–03 title, a cup and two supercups. Rapid dismissed him in the middle of the 2003–04 season while the club was still in the top positions, fighting to win the championship. Afterwards, Rednic had his first coaching experience outside Romania when he signed with Saudi Arabian side Al-Nassr where he spent a few months, bringing Adrian Neaga with him. He then returned in Romania as Universitatea Craiova's manager in the 2004–05 Divizia A season, where after a 3–1 victory against Rapid, at the press conference after the game he sang the chorus of a song made by the Romanian band Ca$$a Locco:"I'm so glad that you took the sting, I'm so glad that you lost!", this being a message to the leaders from Rapid who fired him, however he resigned after a 1–1 against FCM Bacău in the 8th round of the championship. In 2005 he went to coach FC Vaslui in Divizia B, who he helped promote to the first league, but he refused to extend his contract at the end of the season, however after six rounds from the 2005–06 Divizia A season, he came back to the team, helping it avoid relegation. In 2006, Rednic had his first and most successful spell out of the total of five he had at Dinamo București managing to win the 2006–07 Liga I where in the first 13 rounds the team had 13 consecutive victories and won all four derbies against Steaua and Rapid in that season, including the 4–2 victory against Steaua which was the first away victory for The Red Dogs in the derby after 18 years, also managing to pass the group stage of the 2006–07 UEFA Cup, reaching the sixteenths-finals where the team was eliminated with 3–1 on aggregate by Benfica. He resigned from Dinamo after a bad start of the 2007–08 season as the club did not manage to qualify in the Champions League group stage after a 4–2 aggregate loss with Lazio Roma. In October 2007, Rednic returned for a third spell at Rapid which lasted until March 2007 when he resigned. In April 2008, Rednic started his second spell at Dinamo and in the 2008–09 season, the team was on the first position for the most part of the championship, but after three losses in the last three games of the season, the team finished on the 3rd place and he left the club. In August 2009, Rednic went to coach abroad, first at Russian second league side Alania Vladikavkaz with whom he finished the championship in the third position, thus failing to gain promotion to the Russian Premier League and from July 2010 until December 2011, he managed Khazar Lankaran in Azerbaijan where he formed a colony of Romanians, bringing 9 Romanian players to the club, managing to win the Azerbaijan Cup and finished the 2010–11 Azerbaijan Premier League season on the second position, being dismissed after a 1–0 loss against Inter Baku in the 15th round of the 2011–12 regular season. In March 2012, Rednic came back to Romania where he signed a contract with Astra Ploiești until the end of the season when he decided not to continue with Astra, instead, he moved to their biggest rivals, Petrolul Ploiești. In October 2012, Rednic left Petrolul Ploiești in order to go and coach Standard Liège, bringing Romanian players Adrian Cristea and George Țucudean with him, his objective was to reach a European cup position after an unconvincing start of the former coach, eight place in twelve rounds. He made his debut as Les Rouches coach in an away league game which ended with a 2–0 victory against Genk who was the only team unbeaten in the previous 12 rounds of the season, at the game he wore the tie that the club gave him as a gift in 1996 when he was a player and left the club after 5 years. Rednic's contract was not extended at the end of the season after the emphatic 7–1 aggregate win over Gent in the play-off for Europa League qualification. He explicitly attributed his sacking to a conflict between him and club's chairman Roland Duchâtelet who wanted a "marionette" instead of a coach. Instead of Rednic, neither Vercauteren nor Girard has been appointed but the Israel national under-21 team coach Guy Luzon. On 10 June 2013, Rednic returned to Romania, becoming the new head coach of CFR Cluj, but ended his contract by mutual agreement only two months later after winning only one game from the first four played in the championship and had a conflict with the team captain Ricardo Cadú. On 1 October 2013, it was announced that Rednic moved to Gent to replace Víctor Fernández, but was dismissed in April 2014 with a few rounds before the end of the season, the club officials claiming that the relationship between the coach and the players was not good. After a short second spell at Petrolul Ploiești and a third spell at Dinamo with whom he reached a cup final which was lost in front of CFR Cluj, he went to coach a third team in Belgium, Excel Mouscron where he worked with Romanian players Cristian Manea and Dorin Rotariu, taking the club from the last place of the 2016–17 Belgian First Division A and helping it avoid relegation, however he was dismissed the following season after managing to obtain 29 points in 26 rounds, which was considered insufficient by the club's officials. From 2018 until 2021, Rednic had coaching experiences at Saudi Arabian club Al-Faisaly, Politehnica Iași, Viitorul and two spells at Dinamo all of them being short and unsuccessful with a low victory percentage. Mircea Rednic has a total of 375 matches as a manager in the Romanian top-division, Liga I consisting of 165 victories, 104 draws and 106 losses.

Honours

Player
Corvinul Hunedoara
Divizia B: 1979–80
Dinamo București
Divizia A: 1983–84, 1989–90
Cupa României: 1983–84, 1985–86, 1989–90
Standard Liége
Belgian Cup: 1992–93
Rapid București
Divizia A: 1998–99
Cupa României: 1997–98
Supercupa României: 1999

Manager
Rapid București
Divizia A: 1998–99, 2002–03
Cupa României: 2001–02
Supercupa României: 2002, 2003
FC Vaslui
Divizia B: 2004–05
Dinamo București
Liga I: 2006–07
Khazar Lankaran
Azerbaijan Cup: 2010–11

References

External links

 
Mircea Rednic manager profile at Labtof.ro

1962 births
Living people
Sportspeople from Hunedoara
Romanian footballers
Romanian football managers
Romania international footballers
Romania youth international footballers
Association football defenders
Romanian expatriate footballers
Expatriate footballers in Belgium
Expatriate footballers in Turkey
Romanian expatriate sportspeople in Turkey
Liga I players
Liga II players
CS Corvinul Hunedoara players
FC Dinamo București players
FC Rapid București players
Süper Lig players
Bursaspor footballers
Belgian Pro League players
Standard Liège players
Sint-Truidense V.V. players
UEFA Euro 1984 players
1990 FIFA World Cup players
Liga I managers
Romanian expatriate football managers
FC Rapid București managers
FCM Bacău managers
Al Nassr FC managers
FC U Craiova 1948 managers
FC Vaslui managers
FC Dinamo București managers
FC Spartak Vladikavkaz managers
Khazar Lankaran FK managers
FC Astra Giurgiu managers
FC Petrolul Ploiești managers
Standard Liège managers
CFR Cluj managers
K.A.A. Gent managers
Royal Excel Mouscron managers
Al-Faisaly FC managers
FC Politehnica Iași (2010) managers
Belgian Pro League managers
Saudi Professional League managers
Expatriate football managers in Saudi Arabia
Expatriate football managers in Russia
Expatriate football managers in Azerbaijan
Expatriate football managers in Belgium
Romanian expatriate sportspeople in Saudi Arabia
Romanian expatriate sportspeople in Russia
Romanian expatriate sportspeople in Azerbaijan
Romanian expatriate sportspeople in Belgium